William Pell may refer to:
 William Pell (tenor), American opera singer
 William Pell (minister), English nonconformist minister
 William Pell (footballer), English footballer
 William Ferris Pell, American horticulturist